Book of Lightning is the ninth studio album by The Waterboys, released on 2 April 2007 through W14/Universal Records. The album contains ten tracks, produced by Mike Scott and Philip Tennant, with musical contributions from Steve Wickham (fiddle), Richard Naiff (keyboards), Brady Blade (drums), Mark Smith (bass), Leo Abrahams (lead guitar), Jeremy Stacey (drums) plus long-time Waterboys alumni Roddy Lorimer (trumpet), Chris Bruce (lead guitar) and Thighpaulsandra (keyboards). Book of Lightning was recorded in London with the exceptions of one song recorded in Vancouver with members of Canadian art-pop band Great Aunt Ida, and another in Scott's home studio.

Track listing
All tracks by Mike Scott except where noted.

 "The Crash of Angel Wings" – 4:02
 "Love Will Shoot You Down" – 4:34
 "Nobody's Baby Anymore" – 4:43
 "Strange Arrangement" – 3:33
 "She Tried to Hold Me" – 7:18
 "It's Gonna Rain" – 3:03
 "Sustain" (Nilsen, Scott) – 3:21
 "You in the Sky" – 4:38
 "Everybody Takes a Tumble" (Scott, Thistlethwaite) – 7:05
 "The Man With the Wind at His Heels" (Scott, Thistlethwaite) – 3:04

Personnel

 Leo Abrahams – Guitar, Guitar (Electric)
 Johnny Andrews – Vocals, Falsetto
 Dick Beetham – Mastering
 Brady Blade – Drums
 Chris Bruce – Guitar (Electric)
 Clive Deamer – Tabla, Introduction
 Steve Evans – Engineer, Mixing
 Steve Gullick – Photography
 Roddy Lorimer – Trumpet
 Tim Martin – Engineer, Mixing
 Pete Min – Engineer
 Barry Mirochnick – Drums
 Richard Naiff – Organ, Piano
 Ida Nilsen – Piano
 Daniel Presley – Vocals (background), Harmony
 Mike Rowe – Organ, Piano (Electric)
 Mike Scott – Guitar (Acoustic), Guitar, Percussion, Piano, Arranger, Guitar (Electric), Guitar (Rhythm), Sound Effects, Tambourine, Vocals, Bells, Producer, Engineer, Loops, Danelectro Bellzouki electric 12-string guitar, Sleigh Bells, Mixing, Effects
 Helge Skodvin – Photography
 Phil Smee – Cover Design, Booklet Design
 Mark Coates Smith – Resonator
 Jeremy Stacey – Drums
 Colin Stewart – Engineer
 Ren Swan – Mixing
 Phil Tennant – Producer, Management
 Steve Wickham – Fiddle, Viola
 Annie Wilkinson – Resonator

Charts

References

External links
 Lyrics at the official Waterboys homepage
 Mike Scott talks about the album on the official Waterboys homepage

2007 albums
The Waterboys albums